Vita Zubchenko (Ukrainian: Віта Зубченко, born 4 March 1989) is a Ukrainian group rhythmic gymnast. She represents her nation at international competitions.

She participated at the 2008 Summer Olympics in Beijing.  
She also competed at world championships, including at the 2005, 2007 and 2009 World Rhythmic Gymnastics Championships.

References

External links
http://www.the-sports.org/vita-zubchenko-various-indiv-spf78164.html

1989 births
Living people
Ukrainian rhythmic gymnasts
Gymnasts at the 2008 Summer Olympics
Olympic gymnasts of Ukraine
Universiade medalists in gymnastics
Universiade silver medalists for Ukraine
Universiade bronze medalists for Ukraine
Medalists at the 2009 Summer Universiade
21st-century Ukrainian women